The following is a list of notable deaths in November 2018.

Entries for each day are listed alphabetically by surname. A typical entry lists information in the following sequence:
 Name, age, country of citizenship at birth, subsequent country of citizenship (if applicable), reason for notability, cause of death (if known), and reference.

November 2018

1
Francesco Barbaro, 91, Italian gangster, head of the Barbaro 'ndrina.
Nicolas Ghosn, 78, Lebanese lawyer and politician, member of the Parliament (1996–2000, 2005–2018).
Carlo Giuffrè, 89, Italian actor (The Railroad Man, The Girl with the Pistol, Poker in Bed) and stage director.
Bunny Grant, 78, Jamaican boxer, stroke.
Theodor Hoffmann, 83, German admiral, Chief of the Volksmarine (1987–1989) and East Germany Minister of Defense (1989–1990).
Terry Musser, 70, American politician, member of the Wisconsin State Assembly (1985–2009).
Dave Pickerell, 62, American distiller (Maker's Mark), hypertensive heart failure.
Mariano Rajoy Sobredo, 97, Spanish jurist and magistrate.
Ken Swofford, 85, American actor (Fame, Ellery Queen, The Andromeda Strain).
E. K. Turner, 91, Canadian businessman (Saskatchewan Wheat Pool) and educator, chancellor of the University of Saskatchewan (1986–1989), lymphoma.
Yurik Vardanyan, 62, Armenian weightlifter, Olympic champion (1980).
Edmund Zagorski, 63, American convicted double murderer, execution by electric chair.
Paul Zimmerman, 86, American sportswriter (Sports Illustrated).

2
Jean Bertaina, 90, French cyclist.
Naftali Bon, 73, Kenyan Olympic athlete (1968).
Nelson Chabay, 78, Uruguayan footballer (Montevideo, Avellaneda, national team).
Raymond Chow, 91, Hong Kong film producer (Golden Harvest) and presenter.
John Russell, 27th Baron de Clifford, 90, British aristocrat.
Leonard Enright, 65, Irish hurler (Patrickswell, Limerick).
Josh Fauver, 39, American rock bassist (Deerhunter).
Herbert Fingarette, 97, American philosopher, heart failure.
Mark Fosson, 68, American primitive guitarist, cancer.
Roy Hargrove, 49, American jazz trumpeter, Grammy winner (1997, 2002), cardiac arrest.
Jane H. Hill, 79, American anthropologist and linguist.
Max Levitas, 103, Irish communist activist.
Álvaro de Luna, 83, Spanish actor (That Man in Istanbul, Ballad of a Bounty Hunter, Order to Kill), liver cancer. 
Kitty O'Neil, 72, American stuntwoman, pneumonia.
Devah Pager, 46, American sociologist, pancreatic cancer. 
Poongani, 84, Indian Villu Paatu performer.
Albert Ramassamy, 94, French politician, Senator (1983–1987).
Tomás Rodríguez Bolaños, 74, Spanish politician, Mayor of Valladolid (1979–1995), Deputy (1993–2004), Senator (2004–2008).
Sami-ul-Haq, 80, Pakistani cleric and politician, Senator (1985–1997, 2003–2009), stabbed.
Gil Savery, 101, American journalist.
Glenn Schwartz, 78, American musician (James Gang, Pacific Gas & Electric, All Saved Freak Band).
Merete Skavlan, 98, Norwegian actress and director.
Robert F. Taft, 86, American Jesuit priest, Archimandrite of the Ukrainian Greek Catholic Church.
Andrew Urdiales, 54, American serial killer, suicide.

3
Wahiduddin Ahmed, 95, Bangladeshi academic, Vice-Chancellor of Bangladesh University of Engineering and Technology (1975–1983).
Jean-Paul Baréty, 90, French politician, Deputy (1994–1997), Mayor of Nice (1993–1995).
Janusz Bielański, 79, Polish Roman Catholic priest, rector of the Wawel Cathedral (1983–2007).
René Boucher, 89, French Olympic rower.
Chris Bradshaw, 74, Canadian politician.
Joe Clayton, 69, American business executive (Dish Network).
Roland Douce, 79, French botanist.
Alistair Elliot, 86, British poet and translator.
Eddie Foy III, 83, American casting director (Barney Miller).
Maria Guinot, 73, Portuguese singer ("Silêncio e tanta gente"), lung infection.
Colin Holt, 84, Australian footballer (Carlton, Richmond).
Mari Hulman George, 83, American motorsport executive (Indianapolis Motor Speedway).
Hans Kindermann, 96, German jurist.
John Large, 75, British consulting nuclear engineer.
Sondra Locke, 74, American actress (The Heart Is a Lonely Hunter, The Outlaw Josey Wales, Sudden Impact), breast and bone cancer.
John Marttila, 78, American political strategist, prostate cancer.
Jean Mohr, 93, Swiss documentary photographer.
Mimoun El Oujdi, 68, Moroccan raï singer, cancer.
Roger Victor Rakotondrajao, 58, Malagasy Roman Catholic prelate, Bishop of Mahajanga (since 2010).
Ramona Ripston, 91, American civil rights activist (ACLU).
Eric Schiller, 63, American chess player and author, complications from heart disease.
Brent R. Taylor, 39, American military officer, Mayor of North Ogden, Utah (since 2013), shot.
David Tejada, 89, Peruvian doctor, Minister of Health (1985–1987, 1989) and deputy Director General of WHO (1974–1985).
J. Willard Thompson, 83, American racehorse trainer.

4
José Rafael Abinader, 89, Dominican politician, Senator (1998–2002).
Karl-Heinz Adler, 91, German artist.
Manohar Prahlad Awati, 91, Indian Navy vice admiral.
Donna Axum, 76, American model and beauty pageant winner (Miss America 1964), complications from Parkinson's disease.
Gian Luca Barandun, 24, Swiss alpine skier, paragliding crash.
Bill Brown, 80, American football player (Minnesota Vikings, Chicago Bears). 
Bruno Caruso, 91, Sicilian painter, illustrator, writer and political activist. 
Marco Dezzi Bardeschi, 84, Italian architect.
Aleksandr Galkin, 70, Russian football player (Avangard Kursk) and manager.
Jack Gargan, 88, American politician.
Bernie Glassman, 79, American Zen Buddhist monk, complications from a stroke.
Roman Grinev, 41, Russian jazz bassist, fall.
Kateryna Handziuk, 33, Ukrainian politician, thrombosis.
Katherine Herring, 85, American baseball player (All-American Girls Professional Baseball League).
Sir Jeremy Heywood, 56, British civil servant, Cabinet Secretary (2012–2018), cancer.
Harris Hines, 75, American judge, Chief Justice of the Supreme Court of Georgia (2017–2018), traffic collision.
Hung Wen-tung, 80, Taiwanese orthopedist and politician, MLY (1984–1990).
Tariqul Islam, 73, Bangladeshi politician, Minister of Food (2001–2002) and Information (2002–2004), complications from diabetes.
Robin Jeffrey, 79, Scottish engineer and businessman.
Khalid Ibrahim Khan, 69, Pakistani politician, brain haemorrhage.
Richard Le Hir, 71, Canadian politician.
Mustapha Madih, 62, Moroccan football manager.
Vince Manuwai, 38, American football player (Jacksonville Jaguars, Atlanta Falcons), ecstasy poisoning.
Bertil Mårtensson, 73, Swedish author, smoke inhalation.
Jacques Masdeu-Arus, 76, French politician.
John Njenga, 89, Kenyan Roman Catholic prelate, Archbishop of Mombasa (1990–2005).
Grant R. Osborne, 76, American theologian.
Mike Parker, 75, American news reporter (KFI-AM, KNXT, WBBM-TV).
*Juan Antonio Ramírez Sunyer, 71, Spanish judge (Operation Anubis, 2017 Catalan independence referendum).
Goji Sakamoto, 74, Japanese politician.
Shin Seong-il, 81, South Korean actor (To the Last Day, Prince Yeonsan, Why the Cuckoo Cries), lung cancer.
Serhiy Tkach, 66, Soviet-Ukrainian serial killer, heart failure.
Padma Ratna Tuladhar, 78, Nepalese politician, brain haemorrhage.
Douglas Turner, 86, American Olympic rower (1956) and journalist (The Buffalo News).
Wang Huanyu, 63, Chinese astrophysicist, heart attack.

5
Keith Christiansen, 74, Canadian-born American Hall of Fame ice hockey player (Minnesota Fighting Saints), Olympic silver medalist (1972), lung cancer.
Héctor Ferrer, 48, Puerto Rican politician, member of the House of Representatives of Puerto Rico (2001–2018), esophageal cancer.
Ali Squalli Houssaini, 86, Moroccan writer, lyricist of the national anthem.
Nadezhda Kehayova, 40, Bulgarian journalist, heart attack.
Rick Reinert, 93, American animator (Cap'n O. G. Readmore).
Kenneth Roy, 73, Scottish broadcaster and writer.
Masanobu Shinozuka, 87, Japanese engineer.
Peter Tom, 54, Solomon Island politician, MP (since 2006).
Hugh Wilson, 75, American botanist.
Bruno Zaremba, 63, French footballer (Valenciennes).

6
Bangkay, 71, Filipino actor.
Francis Boespflug, 70, French film producer (No Fear, No Die, A Very Long Engagement, High Society).
Coşkun Büktel, 67, Turkish playwright.
Fred Burge, 95, Australian footballer (Richmond).
Jonathan Cantwell, 36, Australian racing cyclist, suicide.
Cliffs of Moher, 4, Irish Thoroughbred racehorse, euthanised.
Deng Qidong, 80, Chinese geologist.
Gavan Disney, 69, Australian television producer (Hey Hey It's Saturday, Healthy, Wealthy and Wise).
John Eshun, 76, Ghanaian Olympic international footballer (1968, 1972).
Tetsuo Gotō, 68, Japanese voice actor (One Piece, Dragon Ball, Death Note), esophageal cancer.
Kristian Halse, 91, Norwegian politician, MP (1972–1973).
Bernard Landry, 81, Canadian politician, Premier of Quebec (2001–2003).
Frances M. López-Morillas, 100, American translator of Spanish literature.
José Lothario, 83, Mexican professional wrestler and manager (NWA, WWF, CWF).
Ted Mack, 84, Australian politician, MP for North Sydney (1990–1996), NSW MP for North Shore (1981–1988), stroke.
Hugh McDowell, 65, English cellist (Electric Light Orchestra, Wizzard), cancer. 
Georges Mehdi, 84, French-born Brazilian judoka.
Dave Morgan, 74, British racing driver, stroke.
Marjatta Moulin, 91, Finnish Olympic fencer (1960).
Ina'am Al-Mufti, 89, Jordanian politician, Minister of Social Development (1979–1984).
Hartman Rector Jr., 94, American general authority of the Church of Jesus Christ of Latter-day Saints.
Robert Stinnett, 94, American sailor, photographer and author.
Ian Ward, 90, British physicist.

7
Hamadjoda Adjoudji, 81, Cameroonian politician.
José Fortunato Álvarez Valdez, 50, Mexican Roman Catholic prelate, Bishop of Gómez Palacio (since 2015).
Robert Anthony Brucato, 87, American Roman Catholic prelate, auxiliary bishop (1997–2007) and apostolic administrator (2000) of New York.
Orlando Corradi, 78, Italian film director and producer.
Friedrich Heimler, 76, German-born Brazilian Roman Catholic prelate, Bishop of Cruz Alta (2002–2014).
Walt Kowalczyk, 83, American football player (Philadelphia Eagles, Dallas Cowboys, Oakland Raiders).
Francis Lai, 86, French film score composer (A Man and a Woman, Rider on the Rain, Love Story), Oscar winner (1971).
Christopher Lehmann-Haupt, 84, Scottish-born American journalist, editor and critic.
Mícheál Ó Súilleabháin, 67, Irish musician and composer.
Bob Patterson, 86, American college basketball player (Tulsa).
Oscar Rabin, 90, Russian painter.
Alan Watson, 85, British legal scholar.
Robert Wilmes, 90, French scout leader.
Xie Shileng, 83, Chinese port and harbor engineer, lymphoma.

8
Harold Basch, 77, American-born Israeli chemist.
Bartolomé Bennassar, 89, French historian.
Milan Chvostek, 86, Canadian documentary film director and producer.
Stan Clements, 95, English footballer (Southampton).
Bonnie Cooper, 83, American baseball player (All-American Girls Professional Baseball League).
Max Croci, 50, Italian film director, cancer.
Bill Godbout, 79, American computer scientist, founder of CompuPro, house fire.
Chin Yang Lee, 102, Chinese-born American author (The Flower Drum Song).
Riccardo Levi-Setti, 91, Italian-born American physicist and professor.
François N. Macerola, 76, Canadian lawyer and film executive.
Ron Negray, 88, American baseball player (Philadelphia Phillies).
Amaliya Panahova, 73, Azerbaijani actress (The Day Passed, Babek), cancer.
Raymond Plank, 96, American businessman (Apache Corporation).
Wallace Triplett, 92, American football player (Detroit Lions, Chicago Cardinals), first African-American draftee to play in the NFL.
Dennis Wrong, 94, Canadian-born American sociologist, heart attack.
Marvin Zuckerman, 90, American psychologist, cardiac arrest.

9
Albert Bitran, 87, Turkish-born French painter and sculptor.
Dorothy Cheney, 68, American scientist, breast cancer.
Richard Paul Conaboy, 93, American judge, District Court Judge for the Middle District of Pennsylvania (1979–1992), heart attack.
James Greene, 91, American actor (Parks and Recreation, The Days and Nights of Molly Dodd, The Missouri Breaks).
Ken Howell, 57, American baseball player (Los Angeles Dodgers, Philadelphia Phillies).
Roger Hoy, 71, English footballer (Tottenham Hotspur, Crystal Palace, Cardiff).
Roger W. Hunt, 80, American politician, member of the South Dakota House of Representatives (1991–2000, 2005–2012, 2015–2017), complications from surgery.
Dražen Janković, 52–53, Serbian musician, heart attack.
Roland Mahauden, 76, Belgian actor and screenwriter.
Janet Paisley, 70, Scottish writer and poet.
Lalan Sarang, 79, Indian actress (Samna, Mahek).
Zdzisław Sosnowski, 94, Polish footballer (Polonia Warsaw).
James Stirling, 65, British physicist, provost of Imperial College London (2013–2018).
Barre Toelken, 83, American folklorist.
Robert Urbain, 87, Belgian politician, Minister of State (since 2004).

10
Ajuma Ameh-Otache, 33, Nigerian footballer (national team).
Raffaele Baldassarre, 62, Italian politician, MEP (2009–2014), heart attack.
Joel Barcellos, 81, Brazilian actor (Os Fuzis, My Home is Copacabana, Sagarana: The Duel), stroke.
Gert Coetzer, 79, South African rugby union and league player (Wakefield Trinity).
Marián Geišberg, 64, Slovak actor.
Ron Johnson, 71, American football player (New York Giants, Michigan Wolverines), complications from Alzheimer's disease.
Liu Xuyi, 105, Chinese historian, stroke.
Herbert London, 79, American political activist and commentator, complications from heart failure.
Liz J. Patterson, 78, American politician, member of the U.S. House of Representatives (1987–1993) and the South Carolina Senate (1980–1987).
Jan Petránek, 86, Czech journalist, commentator and dissident, Charter 77 signatory, heart failure.
John Rogers, 57, Canadian-born American businessman, president of San Diego Comic-Con (since 1986), glioblastoma.
Mahmoud Al-Samra, 95, Jordanian academic and politician, Minister of Culture (1991–1993).
Marc Wilmet, 80, Belgian linguist.

11
Pedro Aranda-Díaz Muñoz, 85, Mexican Roman Catholic prelate, Archbishop of Tulancingo (1975–2008).
Dominic Carmon, 87, American Roman Catholic prelate, Auxiliary Bishop of New Orleans (1993–2006).
Jerry Gant, 56, American visual artist and poet, liver cancer.
Shakti Gawain, 70, American author, complications from hip surgery.
Olga Harmony, 90, Mexican playwright.
Wayne Maunder, 80, Canadian-born American actor (Custer, Lancer, Porky's), cardiovascular disease.
Donald McCaig, 78, American writer (Rhett Butler's People), chronic obstructive pulmonary disease and heart disease.
Alun Morgan, 90, Welsh jazz critic.
Sailendu Nath Phukan, 81, Indian judge.
Douglas Rain, 90, Canadian actor (2001: A Space Odyssey).
Frankie Schneider, 92, American racing driver.
Najaf Abbas Sial, 59, Pakistani politician, member of the National Assembly (2013–2018).
Hiroyuki Sonoda, 76, Japanese politician, MP (since 1986), pneumonia.
Zeng Shiqiang, 84, Taiwanese sinologist.

12
John Cairns, 95, British physician and molecular biologist.
D. J. Finney, 101, British statistician.
Dean Hartle, 87, American politician, member of the Minnesota House of Representatives (1985–1992).
Roy T. Haverkamp, 93, American diplomat, United States Ambassador to Grenada (1984–1986).
Kurt Kaiser, 83, American composer.
Yoshito Kajiya, 80, Japanese politician, member of the House of Councillors (since 2001), heart failure.
Ananth Kumar, 59, Indian politician, Minister of Parliamentary Affairs (since 2016), Chemicals and Fertilizers (since 2014) and Civil Aviation (1998–1999), lung cancer.
Lee Min-hye, 33, South Korean Olympic racing cyclist (2008, 2012), Asian Games winner (2010), leukemia.
Stan Lee, 95, American comic book writer and publisher (Marvel Comics), heart and respiratory failure.
Igor Luchenok, 80, Belarusian composer, People's Artist of the USSR and Belarus.
Ibrahim Salem Mohammedin, 97, Egyptian engineer and industrialist, Minister of Industry (1973–1974).
Maryse Morandini, 85, French Olympic swimmer (1952).
Fred Patten, 77, American novelist and historian.
David Pearson, 83, American Hall of Fame racing driver (NASCAR).
Toivo Topias Pohjala, 87, Finnish politician, Minister of Agriculture and Forestry (1987–1991).
Stuart H. Walker, 95, American Olympic yachtsman (1968) and writer, stomach cancer.
Wang Junmin, 63, Chinese politician, Vice-Governor of Shandong (2002–2012).

13
Sir John Anderson, 73, New Zealand banker (ANZ Bank New Zealand), broadcast executive (TVNZ) and sport administrator (New Zealand Cricket).
Johan Asplund, 81, Swedish sociologist.
Robert C. Atchley, 79, American gerontologist and sociologist.
Frederick Berry, 68, American politician, member of the Massachusetts Senate (1983–2013).
Ronald P. Dore, 93, British sociologist.
Richard Fremantle, 82, American art historian.
Lucho Gatica, 90, Chilean bolero singer and actor.
Jene Golovchenko, 72, American physicist.
Caroline Rose Hunt, 95, American heiress, hotelier (Rosewood Hotels & Resorts), and philanthropist, stroke.
Marcella Jeandeau, 90, Italian Olympic sprinter (1948).
Everett A. Kelly, 92, American politician, Member of the Florida House of Representatives (1978–2000).
Floyd Lloyd, 70, Jamaican reggae musician.
Katherine MacGregor, 93, American actress (Little House on the Prairie).
John Meadows III, 74, American politician, member of the Georgia House of Representatives (since 2004), stomach cancer.
William Mullan, 90, Scottish football referee.
Ken Narita, 73, Japanese singer, pneumonia.
Daniel Puckel, 85, American Olympic sport shooter (1960).
Charles Sargent, 73, American politician, member of the Tennessee House of Representatives (since 1997), cancer. 
David Stewart, 71, Scottish footballer (Ayr United, Leeds United, national team).
Jean-Claude Thomas, 68, French politician, Deputy (1988–2012).
Kalevi Viskari, 90, Finnish artistic gymnast, Olympic bronze medallist (1952).
John Wilson, 75, British angler, stroke.

14
Ben Atchley, 88, American politician, member of the Tennessee House of Representatives (1972–1976) and Senate (1977–2005).
Raymond Arritt, 61, American agronomist, stroke.
Camilo Catrillanca, 24, Chilean indigenous activist, shot.
Sir Sze-yuen Chung, 101, Hong Kong politician, Senior Unofficial Member of Legislative Council (1974–1978) and Executive Council (1980–1988).
Prabhat Nalini Das, 91, Indian academic.
Aníbal González Irizarry, 91, Puerto Rican journalist and broadcaster.
Morten Grunwald, 83, Danish actor (Olsen Gang) and director, thyroid cancer.
James V. Hansen, 86, American politician, member of the U.S. House of Representatives from Utah's 1st congressional district (1981–2003). 
Rolf Hoppe, 87, German actor (I Was Nineteen, Tři oříšky pro Popelku, Mephisto).
Francisco Molina, 88, Spanish-Chilean football player (Atlético Madrid, Audax Italiano) and manager (Deportes Antofagasta).
Fernando del Paso, 83, Mexican novelist and poet.
Fritz Rohrlich, 97, American theoretical physicist.
Masahiro Sayama, 64, Japanese jazz pianist.
Tim Stockdale, 54, British equestrian, stomach cancer.
Mario Suárez, 92, Venezuelan folk singer.
Gottfried Weilenmann, 98, Swiss racing cyclist, Tour de Suisse winner (1949).
Howard Weyers, 84, American football player and coach (Michigan State Spartans).
Mark Wolfson, 84, British politician, MP for Sevenoaks (1979–1997).
Douglas Wright, 62, New Zealand dancer and choreographer, cancer.
George Yardley, 76, Scottish footballer (East Fife, Tranmere Rovers).

15
Ba Zhongtan, 88, Chinese lieutenant general, commander of the People's Armed Police (1992–1996).
Edwin Beckett, 81, British army general.
E. D. Blodgett, 83, Canadian poet and translator.
John Bluthal, 89, Polish-born British-Australian actor (Never Mind the Quality, Feel the Width, The Vicar of Dibley, Hail, Caesar!).
Anne Carroll, 78, British actress (Bellman and True, Coldblooded, K-PAX).
Roy Clark, 85, American Hall of Fame country singer and television host (Hee Haw), complications from pneumonia.
Aethelred Eldridge, 88, American artist.
Takayuki Fujikawa, 56, Japanese footballer (Verdy Kawasaki), stomach cancer.
E. S. Raja Gopal, 82, Indian condensed matter physicist.
Adolf Grünbaum, 95, German-American philosopher.
Kacem Kefi, 73, Tunisian composer and singer. 
Sonny Knowles, 86, Irish singer.
Zhores Medvedev, 93, Russian agronomist, biologist and dissident.
Seiji Nakamura, 87, Japanese politician, MP (since 1983).
Mike Noble, 88, British comic artist and illustrator (Fireball XL5).
Jan Persson, 75, Danish photographer, cancer.
Luigi Rossi di Montelera, 72, Italian businessman (Martini & Rossi) and politician, Deputy (1976–1992), heart attack.
Aldyr Schlee, 83, Brazilian writer and illustrator, designer of football national team jersey.
Ivan Smirnov, 63, Russian composer and guitarist.
Sigmund Steinnes, 59, Norwegian politician, cancer.
Ann Symonds, 79, Australian politician, member of the New South Wales Legislative Council (1982–1998).
Lubomir Tomaszewski, 95, Polish-American artist.
Jane Wenham, 90, English actress (An Inspector Calls, Testament of Youth).
Yves Yersin, 76, Swiss film director (Les petites fugues).
Zhang Ting, 96, Chinese politician, Minister of the Electronics Industry (1982–1983).

16
Hatem Ben Rabah, 47, Tunisian actor.
Andrew Burt, 73, British actor (Emmerdale Farm).
Francisco Calvo Serraller, 70, Spanish art historian.
George A. Cooper, 93, British actor (Tom Jones, Coronation Street, Grange Hill).
Scott English, 81, American songwriter ("Brandy") and record producer.
Paul Ferris, 89, British author and journalist.
Pablo Ferro, 83, Cuban-born American graphic designer, complications from pneumonia.
Alec Finn, 74, English-born Irish bouzouki player (De Dannan).
William Goldman, 87, American author (The Princess Bride) and screenwriter (Butch Cassidy and the Sundance Kid, All the President's Men), Oscar winner (1970, 1977), complications from colon cancer and pneumonia.
Jerry Miller, 80, American racing driver.
Jeanne Mockford, 92, English actress (Up Pompeii!, Fourplay, Hellboy II: The Golden Army), dementia.
Flemming Nielsen, 84, Danish footballer (Atalanta, Greenock Morton, national team).
Gerry O'Malley, 90, Canadian politician, MLA (1988–1998).
Bunny Sterling, 70, Jamaican-born British boxer, European middleweight champion (1976), dementia.
Nick Testa, 90, American baseball player (San Francisco Giants).
Hiromasa Yonekura, 81, Japanese businessman, CEO of Sumitomo Chemical.

17
Richard Baker, 93, English broadcaster (BBC News, Start the Week, Melodies for You).
Les Beasley, 90, American southern gospel singer.
Gene Berce, 91, American basketball player (Oshkosh All-Stars, Tri-Cities Blackhawks).
Barrie Betts, 86, English footballer (Manchester City, Scunthorpe United, Stockport County).
Jens Büchner, 49, German singer (Ich bin ein Star – Holt mich hier raus!), lung cancer.
Kuldip Singh Chandpuri, 77, Indian military officer, commander in the Battle of Longewala.
*Cheng Kaijia, 100, Chinese nuclear physicist and engineer.
Peter Arthur Cox, 96, British civil engineer.
Kayo Dottley, 90, American football player (Chicago Bears).
Jim Dressler, 86, American politician.
Eduard von Falz-Fein, 106, Russian-born Liechtensteiner businessman, journalist and sportsman, house fire.
Jerry Frankel, 88, American theater and film producer.
Jim Iley, 82, English football player (Sheffield United, Nottingham Forest) and manager (Barnsley).
Motohiko Kondo, 64, Japanese politician, MP (since 2000), sepsis.
Banamali Maharana, 77, Indian percussionist.
Iain Moireach, 80, Scottish Gaelic writer.
Juan Olabarri, 82, Spanish Olympic sailor.
Alyque Padamsee, 87, Indian actor (Gandhi) and adman.
Cyril Pahinui, 68, American slack-key guitarist and singer.
Mary Kay Stearns, 93, American actress.
Metin Türel, 83, Turkish football player (PTT, İstanbulspor) and manager (national team).

18
Ethel Ayler, 88, American actress (To Sleep with Anger, The Bodyguard, The Cosby Show). 
Héctor Beltrán Leyva, 56, Mexican drug cartel leader (Beltrán-Leyva Cartel), heart attack.
Waldyr Boccardo, 82, Brazilian basketball player, world champion (1959) and Olympic bronze medalist (1960).
Klaus Bockisch, 79, German footballer (SC Preußen Münster, FC 08 Villingen).
Ed Evanko, 80, Canadian singer and actor (Sudden Death, Double Jeopardy), stroke.
Weeshie Fogarty, 77, Irish Gaelic footballer and sports broadcaster (Radio Kerry).
John Mantle, 76, Welsh rugby union (Newport) and league player (St Helens, Great Britain).
Eiichi Nakao, 88, Japanese politician, Minister of International Trade and Industry (1990–1991).
Peter Peryer, 77, New Zealand photographer.
Eddie Reeves, 79, American songwriter ("All I Ever Need Is You") and record label executive (Warner Bros. Records), stroke.
Jennie Stoller, 72, British actress (The Good Father, Sapphire & Steel, King Ralph), cancer.
Muhammad Abdul Wahhab, 95, Pakistani Islamic cleric, Amir of Tablighi Jamaat (since 1992), dengue fever.
Uladzimir Zhuravel, 47, Belarusian football player (Dinamo Minsk, national team) and manager (Dynamo Brest).

19
James Aggrey-Orleans, 81, Ghanaian diplomat, High Commissioner to the United Kingdom (1997–2001).
Georges Benedetti, 88, French doctor and politician, Deputy (1981–1986, 1988–1993) and Senator (1986–1988).
Dominique Blanchar, 91, French actress (Le Secret de Mayerling, The Song of Sister Maria, L'Avventura).
Tosyn Bucknor, 37, Nigerian radio and television presenter, sickle cell anaemia.
Bill Caddick, 74, English folk singer and guitarist.
Pablo Cedano Cedano, 82, Dominican Roman Catholic prelate, Auxiliary Bishop of Santo Domingo (1996–2013).
Neil Collins, 77, New Zealand broadcaster (4ZB, Radio Dunedin) and politician (Dunedin City Council).
Alfred Evers, 83, Belgian politician.
Apisai Ielemia, 63, Tuvaluan politician, Prime Minister (2006–2010).
Dan Maloney, 68, Canadian ice hockey player (Toronto Maple Leafs, Los Angeles Kings) and coach (Winnipeg Jets).
Larry Pickering, 76, Australian political cartoonist, lung cancer.
Larry Pierce, 68, American country singer and comedian, heart attack.
Eva Probst, 88, German actress (I Lost My Heart in Heidelberg, Prosecutor Corda, Son Without a Home).
Alí Rodríguez Araque, 81, Venezuelan politician and diplomat, Minister of Foreign Affairs (2004–2006) and Finance (2008–2010), ambassador to Cuba (since 2014).
Shiao Yi, 83, Taiwanese-American wuxia novelist.
Witold Sobociński, 89, Polish cinematographer (The Adventures of Gerard, The Hourglass Sanatorium, Frantic) and academic.
Wu Jianchang, 79, Chinese engineer and politician, Vice-Minister of Metallurgical Industry (1997–1998).

20
Yusif Abubakar, 60, Ghanaian football manager (Medeama, Berekum Chelsea, Hearts of Oak).
Levine Andrade, 64, Indian-born British violinist, heart attack.
Roy Bailey, 83, English folk singer.
Cyril Belshaw, 96, New-Zealand-born Canadian anthropologist.
James H. Billington, 89, American academic, Librarian of Congress (1987–2015), pneumonia.
Robert Blythe, 71, Welsh actor (High Hopes, Whoops Apocalypse, Rebecca's Daughters).
Eddie C. Campbell, 79, American blues musician, complications from a stroke.
Mac Collins, 74, American politician, member of the U.S. House of Representatives from Georgia's 8th district (1993–2005).
Shlomo Erell, 98, Israeli military general, Commander of the Navy (1966–1968).
Anvar Khamei, 101, Iranian sociologist, economist and journalist, respiratory failure.
Sir Aaron Klug, 92, Lithuanian-born British chemist and biophysicist, Nobel Prize winner (1982).
Henry Metzger, 86, German-born American immunologist.
Monet's Garden, 20, Irish racehorse, euthanized.
Gordon Morritt, 76, English footballer (Rotherham United, Doncaster Rovers, York City).
Eimuntas Nekrošius, 65, Lithuanian stage director and actor (The Corridor), heart attack.
Mildred Persinger, 100, American feminist.
Dietmar Schwager, 78, German footballer (1. FC Kaiserslautern).
Monica Sims, 93, British broadcasting executive.
Wayne Stayskal, 86, American cartoonist, complications from Alzheimer's disease.
Robert W. Thomson, 84, British professor of Armenian studies.
Bruno Veselica, 82, Croatian footballer (Rijeka).

21
Emmanuel Kwabena Kyeremateng Agyarko, 60, Ghanaian politician, MP (since 2012).
Meena Alexander, 67, Indian-born American poet, writer and scholar, endometrial serous cancer.
Mamane Barka, 59, Nigerien musician.
Michele Carey, 75, American actress (El Dorado, Live a Little, Love a Little).
Evaristo Marc Chengula, 77, Tanzanian Roman Catholic prelate, Bishop of Mbeya (since 1996).
Angelica Cob-Baehler, 47, American music industry executive, cancer.
Giuseppe Dante, 87, Italian cyclist.
Dean Gitter, 83, American entrepreneur and real estate developer.
Rodney Green, 79, English footballer (Halifax Town), complications from dementia.
Olivia Hooker, 103, American psychologist and yeoman, first African-American woman in the U.S. Coast Guard, last survivor of the Tulsa race riot.
Igor Korobov, 62, Russian intelligence officer, Director of the Main Intelligence Directorate (since 2016).
Lau Nai-keung, 71, Hong Kong academic, businessman, and politician, cancer.
Jan-Lauritz Opstad, 68, Norwegian art historian and museum director.
Francisco de Paula Victor, 83, Brazilian Roman Catholic prelate, Bishop of Turres in Numidia (since 1996) and Auxiliary Bishop of Brasília (1996–2011).
Jose Peralta, 47, American politician, member of the New York Senate (since 2010), septic shock.
Gianfranco Rastrelli, 86, Italian politician, Deputy (1994–1996).
Fahmida Riaz, 72, Pakistani poet, writer and activist.
M. I. Shanavas, 67, Indian politician, MP (since 2009), complications from liver transplant.
Edward Timms, 81, British academic.

22
Soslan Andiyev, 66, Russian freestyle wrestler, Olympic champion (1976, 1980).
Gerald Berenson, 96, American cardiologist.
Len Campbell, 71, Scottish footballer (Dumbarton).
Andrzej Fischer, 66, Polish footballer.
Jacqueline Hassink, 52, Dutch photographer.
Betty Jaynes, 97, American actress (Babes in Arms, Meet the People, I Love Lucy).
Imrat Khan, 83, Indian sitar player, stroke.
Yu-chien Kuan, 87, Chinese-born German defector, sinologist and writer, cancer.
Nicolae Mihalcea, 96, Romanian Olympic equestrian (1952, 1956).
Willie Naulls, 84, American basketball player (UCLA, New York Knicks, Boston Celtics).
Baishnab Charan Parida, 77, Indian politician, MP (2010–2016), cancer.
Carrie Saxon Perry, 87, American politician, Mayor of Hartford, Connecticut (1987–1993), heart attack.
Richard Philippe, 28, French racing driver, helicopter crash.
Albert Ritzenberg, 100, American tennis player and coach.
Judith Rodriguez, 82, Australian poet.

23
Kevin Austin, 45, English footballer (Lincoln City, Swansea City, Trinidad and Tobago national team), pancreatic cancer.
Mariano Bellver, 92, Spanish art patron.
Betty Bumpers, 93, American childhood immunizations activist, First Lady of Arkansas (1971–1975), complications from dementia and a broken hip.
Menahem Degani, 91, Israeli Olympic basketball player (1952).
Raed Fares, 46, Syrian anti-government activist, shot.
Bernard Gauthier, 94, French road racing cyclist.
Bujor Hălmăgeanu, 77, Romanian football player (Steaua București, national team) and manager (Dacia Unirea Brăila), respiratory failure.
Mick McGeough, 62, Canadian ice hockey referee, stroke.
Bob McNair, 81, American businessman and sports club owner (Houston Texans), cancer.
Sandeep Michael, 33, Indian field hockey player, brain disease.
Stan Perron, 96, Australian businessman.
Jean-Loup Rivière, 70, French playwright.
Nicolas Roeg, 90, English film director (Don't Look Now, The Man Who Fell to Earth) and cinematographer (A Funny Thing Happened on the Way to the Forum).
Freddie Stockdale, 71, English opera impresario, bowel cancer.
George Ty, 86, Hong Kong-born Filipino banker, founder of Metrobank, pancreatic cancer.
Gerard Unger, 76, Dutch graphic and type designer.

24
Ambareesh, 66, Indian Kannada actor (Naagarahaavu, Paduvaaralli Pandavaru) and politician, MP (1998–2009), heart attack.
Helena Anhava, 93, Finnish poet, author and translator.
Enrique Bernales Ballesteros, 78, Peruvian politician, Senator (1980–1992), UN Special Rapporteur on mercenaries (1987–2004) and member of PCA (since 2013), cancer.
Gordon Copeland, 75, New Zealand politician, MP (2002–2008).
Lou Cvijanovich, 92, American basketball coach (Santa Clara High School).
David Defiagbon, 48, Nigerian-Canadian boxer, Olympic silver medalist (1996), heart attack.
Walt Dziedzic, 85, American politician.
Harold Farberman, 89, American conductor.
Saida Gunba, 59, Georgian javelin thrower, Olympic silver medalist (1980).
Ray Hill, 78, American LGBT activist, heart failure.
I Want Revenge, 12, American Thoroughbred racehorse, virus.
Rune Jansson, 86, Swedish Greco-Roman wrestler, Olympic bronze medalist (1956).
Ricky Jay, 72, American stage magician and actor (Tomorrow Never Dies, Magnolia, Deadwood).
Sy Kattelson, 95, American photographer.
Gene Leedy, 90, American architect.
Robert C. Morlino, 71, American Roman Catholic prelate, Bishop of Madison (since 2003), heart attack.
Ikeogu Oke, 51, Nigerian poet and journalist.
José Panizo, 82, Spanish Olympic wrestler (1960, 1964).
Fred Quayle, 82, American politician, member of the Virginia Senate (1992–2012).
Věra Růžičková, 90, Czech gymnast, Olympic champion (1948).
Shi Jiaonai, 97, Chinese plant physiologist, member of the Chinese Academy of Sciences.
Amanda Swimmer, 97, American Cherokee potter.

25
Jacques Baudin, 79, Senegalese politician, Foreign Minister (1998–2000).
Randolph L. Braham, 95, Romanian-born American historian and political scientist.
Giuliana Calandra, 82, Italian actress (La calandria, Deep Red, L'affittacamere).
Paul Ellingworth, 87, British biblical scholar.
Dinny Flanagan, 88, Canadian ice hockey player (Lethbridge Maple Leafs), world champion (1951).
Roger Hamelin, 77, Canadian football player (Winnipeg Blue Bombers).
Tony Hanson, 63, American basketball player (Connecticut Huskies) and coach (Tees Valley Mohawks), heart attack.
Viktor Kanevskyi, 82, Ukrainian football player (Dynamo Kyiv, national team) and manager (Dynamo Kharkiv).
Gloria Katz, 76, American screenwriter and film producer (American Graffiti, Indiana Jones and the Temple of Doom, Howard the Duck), ovarian cancer.
Wright King, 95, American actor (A Streetcar Named Desire, Stagecoach to Fury, Planet of the Apes).
Willard Kinzie, 99, Canadian businessman and politician, Mayor of Barrie (1957–1961).
Łukasz Kwiatkowski, 36, Polish Olympic track cyclist (2004, 2008), leukemia.
Abba Kyari, 80, Nigerian Army brigadier, Governor of North-Central State (1967–1974).
Moncef Lazaâr, Tunisian actor and screenwriter.
Norio Maeda, 83, Japanese composer and pianist.
Larry Matysik, 72, American professional wrestling commentator and author.
Claude Péloquin, 76, Canadian poet, cancer.
Darren Pitcher, 49, English footballer (Charlton Athletic, Crystal Palace).
C. K. Jaffer Sharief, 85, Indian politician, Minister of Railways (1991–1995).
Shep Shepherd, 101, American jazz musician.
Sinndar, 21, Irish racehorse. (death announced on this date)
Graham Williams, 81, Welsh footballer (Everton, Swansea Town, Tranmere Rovers).

26
Bernardo Bertolucci, 77, Italian film director (Last Tango in Paris, The Last Emperor, 1900), Oscar winner (1988), lung cancer.
Umberto Borsò, 95, Italian opera singer.
Luc Deflo, 60, Belgian writer.
Mark Farrell, 65, British tennis player.
Stanislav Gorkovenko, 80, Russian conductor.
Samuel Hadida, 64, Moroccan-born French film distributor and producer (True Romance, Resident Evil, Silent Hill).
Johnny Hart, 90, English football player and manager (Manchester City), dementia.
Stephen Hillenburg, 57, American animator (SpongeBob SquarePants, Rocko's Modern Life) and marine biologist, amyotrophic lateral sclerosis.
Wally Hinshelwood, 89, English footballer (Fulham, Reading, Bristol City).
Sir Charles Huxtable, 87, British military officer, Commander-in-Chief, Land Forces (1988–1990).
Bonita Mabo, 75, Australian educator and indigenous activist.
Iravatham Mahadevan, 88, Indian scholar and civil servant.
Tomás Maldonado, 96, Argentine painter and designer.
Patricia Quintana, 72, Mexican chef, writer and academic.
Leo Schwarz, 87, German Roman Catholic prelate, Auxiliary Bishop of Trier (1982–2006).
Jean Barker, Baroness Trumpington, 96, British politician and socialite, member of the House of Lords (1980–2017).

27
Boris Aristov, 93, Russian politician, Soviet Ambassador to Finland (1988–1992) and Poland (1978–1983), Soviet Minister of Foreign Trade (1985–1988).
Mohammed Aziz, 64, Indian playback singer, heart attack.
Sultan Al-Bargan, 35, Saudi footballer (Al-Hilal, Al-Ettifaq, Al-Raed), complications from a stroke.
Janet Cox-Rearick, 88, American art historian.
Ed Galigher, 68, American football player (New York Jets, San Francisco 49ers), complications following lung transplant surgery.
Benjamín Gallegos Soto, 58, Mexican pilot and politician, Deputy (1997–2000) and Senator (2000–2006), heart attack.
Harold O. Levy, 65, American lawyer and philanthropist, New York City School Chancellor (2000–2002), amyotrophic lateral sclerosis.
Medardo Luis Luzardo Romero, 83, Venezuelan Roman Catholic prelate, Archbishop of Ciudad Bolívar (1986–2011).
Johnny Maddox, 91, American pianist and historian.
Ed Pastor, 75, American politician, member of the U.S. House of Representatives from Arizona's 2nd, 4th, and 7th districts (1991–2015), heart attack.
H. S. Prakash, 67, Indian politician, MLA (1994–1999, 2004–2007, since 2008).
V. K. Rao, 104, Indian civil servant, Principal Secretary to the President (1981–1982).
Leo P. Ribuffo, 73, American historian.
Goran Stefanovski, 66, Macedonian playwright.
Mahito Tsujimura, 88, Japanese actor and voice actor (Patlabor: The Movie).
Barbara Brooks Wallace, 95, American author, complications from pneumonia.
John Wulp, 90, American scenic designer and stage director (Dracula), Tony winner (1978).

28
Thomas J. J. Altizer, 91, American theologian, stroke.
Nicanor de Carvalho, 71, Brazilian football manager (Paulista, Ponte Preta, Shonan Bellmare), heart attack.
Anthony Frew, 63, British physician.
Richard Fulton, 91, American politician, member of the  U.S. House of Representatives from Tennessee's 5th district (1963–1975), Mayor of Nashville (1975–1987).
Gary Haisman, 60, English musician.
Masahiko Katsuya, 57, Japanese columnist and photographer, alcoholic hepatitis.
Andrea Milani, 70, Italian mathematician and astronomer.
Robert Morris, 87, American sculptor, pneumonia.
Roger Neumann, 77, American jazz saxophonist.
Zulkifli Nurdin, 70, Indonesian politician, Governor of Jambi (1999–2004, 2005–2010).
Nancy Paterson, 61, Canadian artist and writer.
Blaže Ristovski, 87, Macedonian linguist and historian.
Georgie Salter, 67, New Zealand netball player (national team) and coach (Otago Rebels).
Harry Leslie Smith, 95, British writer and political commentator, pneumonia.

29
Harue Akagi, 94, Japanese actress (Magic Boy, Bushido, Samurai Saga, Pecoross' Mother and Her Days).
John D. F. Black, 85, American screenwriter and producer (The Mary Tyler Moore Show, Star Trek).
Elisa Brune, 52, Belgian writer.
Altaf Fatima, 91, Pakistani novelist and writer.
Brigitte Gapais-Dumont, 74, French fencer, Olympic silver medalist (1976).
Eldon George, 87, Canadian fossil hunter and geologist.
Ruth Haring, 63, American chess player.
Charles "Chuck" Harrison, 87, American industrial engineer.
Ralph Hodge, 65, American college basketball coach (Olivet Nazarene).
Garnik A. Karapetyan, 60, Armenian mathematician and academic.
Masaru Kawasaki, 94, Japanese conductor and composer.
Ulrich Leyendecker, 72, German composer.
Hans Maier, 102, Dutch Olympic water polo player (1936).
Viktor Matviyenko, 70, Ukrainian football player (Dynamo Kyiv) and manager, Olympic bronze medalist (1976).
Christine Muzio, 67, French fencer, Olympic champion (1980).
Thomas O'Neil, 82, New Zealand cricketer.
Robert Plotnik, 75, American record store owner, complications from a stroke.
Miguel Romero Esteo, 88, Spanish writer and playwright.

30
Jon Ramon Aboitiz, 70, Spanish-Filipino businessman (Aboitiz Equity Ventures).
Peter Armitage, 79, British actor (Coronation Street, Jack the Ripper, Hearts and Minds), heart attack.
Roger Burton, 90, American actor (Baskets).
George H. W. Bush, 94, American politician, President (1989–1993), Vice President (1981–1989), Director of Central Intelligence (1976–1977), complications from Parkinson's disease.
Fred Caligiuri, 100, American baseball player (Philadelphia Athletics).
Chang Guitian, 76, Chinese xiangsheng actor.
Attash Durrani, 66, Pakistani linguist and gemologist.
Luigi Farace, 84, Italian politician, Deputy (1987–1994) and Mayor of Bari (1978–1981).
Palden Gyatso, 85, Tibetan Buddhist monk and political prisoner, liver cancer.
Andreas Janc, 80, Austrian Olympian
Julie Kaatz, Australian cricketer (Queensland).
Joseph L. Tauro, 87, American federal judge, United States District Court for the District of Massachusetts (since 1972).
Harvey Tyson, 90, South African journalist and editor.
Herbert Woodson, 93, American engineer.
Cyril Woolford, 91, English rugby league footballer (Castleford, Doncaster, Featherstone Rovers).

References

2018-11
 11